Football Club Noah, commonly known as Noah is an Armenian professional football club based in  the capital Yerevan. Founded in 2017 as FC Artsakh, they currently play in the Armenian Premier League.

History
The club was founded as FC Artsakh in 2017 and played its first match in a goalless draw against FC Banants on 2 June 2017. Noah played its first competitive season in the 2017–18 Armenian First League, finishing second and achieving promotion to the Armenian Premier League.

After a disappointing 8th place finish in the 2018–19 season, the club was sold to Karen Abrahamyan, who rebranded the club FC Noah in 2019.

Noah won the 2019–20 Armenian Cup, defeating Ararat-Armenia on penalties.

Domestic

European

Colours and badge
As FC Artsakh the club's main kit colours were red and white, however following the rebranding, the club chose black and a light green to represent the club. 
Umbro became the kit supplier for the 2019-20, following two years of using Nike.

Badge history
From 2017 to 2019, the club operated as FC Artsakh, bearing a red round badge with an eagle. Following the 2019 rebranding as FC Noah, the club's emblem was changed to a simple black text:"Yerevan Armenia Football Club Noah".

Stadium

At the beginning phase of the 2018–19 Armenian Premier League season, FC Noah used the Mika Stadium, located in the Shengavit neighborhood of Yerevan, as their home ground until matchday 8. They were then forced to leave the Mika Stadium due to the inappropriate pitch conditions, and between matchday 9 and 14 they played at the Pyunik Stadium before moving to the artificial-turf pitch of the Dzoraghbyur Training Centre at the eastern outskirts of Yerevan. 
For the 2019–20 Armenian Premier League season, FC Noah played at the Alashkert Stadium located in the same neighbourhood of Yerevan.

After starting the 2021–22 Armenian Premier League season playing their home games at the Yerevan Football Academy Stadium in Yerevan, Noah moved their home games to the Armavir City Stadium in Armavir in February 2022.

Players

Current squad

Out on loan

Coaching staff

Honours
FC Noah won their first trophy on 10 July 2020, defeating Ararat-Armenia on penalties to win the 2019–20 Armenian Cup.

Domestic
Armenian Cup
Winners: 2019–20

Armenian Supercup
Winners: 2020

References

 
Football clubs in Armenia
Association football clubs established in 2017
Football clubs in Yerevan
2017 establishments in Armenia